Vertige is a Canadian film, directed by Jean Beaudin and released in 1969. An examination of youth culture in the era, the film uses psychedelic techniques to depict young people hedonistically seeking escape in sexual activity and drug use.

The film won the Canadian Film Award for Best Film Over 30 Minutes at the 21st Canadian Film Awards in 1969, and Serge Garant received a special award for the film's score.

In 2012, experimental filmmaker Marc Campbell released a recut of Vertige, replacing Garant's original soundtrack with a radically slowed down version of The Beatles' song "I Am the Walrus".

References

External links

Watch Vertige at the National Film Board of Canada

1969 films
Canadian short documentary films
Best Theatrical Short Film Genie and Canadian Screen Award winners
National Film Board of Canada documentaries
1969 short films
Films directed by Jean Beaudin
French-language Canadian films
Canadian avant-garde and experimental short films
1960s Canadian films